Laurent Gathier is a French engineer and space pioneer born in 1953 in Friedrichshafen, Germany. He is married and the father of three boys and currently the director of space activities of Dassault Aviation, in Saint-Cloud.

He spent his adolescence in the Chambéry-Grenoble area, a period when he learnt how to build model planes and also became a pilot (gliders and planes). He first flew solo when he was 15.

His first passion for space came from the launch of the first French satellite A-1, nicknamed Astérix, in November 1965, when he was 12. He spent entire nights watching the sky at that time.

When he joined Supaéro in Toulouse in 1973, he had already flown 1000 hours. He specialized in space and obtained his engineering degree in 1976.

Then he start working in CNES in Toulouse and Aerospatiale in Cannes. Afterwards he joined Dassault Aviation flight tests. He became head of the flight test program.

At the beginning of 2000, he joined the Space Directorate of Dassault.
 
With Jean-Pierre Haigneré, and Alain Dupas, he has created the Astronaute Club Européen (ACE), the first French association aimed at creating a European space tourism vehicle.

References

Interview of Laurent Gathier 
 Website of Astronaute Club Européen

1953 births
Living people
French aerospace engineers
French aviators
People from Friedrichshafen